Greece has two adaptations of the singing competition Pop Idol under two different titles and on two different networks:
 Super Idol, which was aired in 2004 on Mega Channel
 Greek Idol, which premiered in 2010 on Alpha TV

Super Idol (Greek TV series)
Greek-language television shows
Greek reality television series
Television series by Fremantle (company)